Kateshal or Katshal, also rendered as Kateh Shal, may refer to:
 Kateshal-e Bala
 Kateshal-e Pain